The Presbyterian Church of Ghana is a mainline Protestant church denomination in Ghana. The oldest, continuously existing, established Christian Church in Ghana, it was started by the Basel missionaries on 18 December 1828. The missionaries had been trained in Germany and Switzerland and arrived on the Gold Coast to spread Christianity. The work of the mission became stronger when Moravian missionaries from the West Indies arrived in the country in 1843. In 1848, the Basel Mission Church set up a seminary, now named the Presbyterian College of Education, Akropong, for the training of church workers to help in the missionary work. The Ga and Twi languages were added as part of the doctrinal text used in the training of the seminarians. In the 19th and early 20th centuries, the Presbyterian church had its missions concentrated in the southeastern parts of the Gold Coast and the peri-urban Akan hinterland. By the mid-20th century, the church had expanded and founded churches among the Asante people who lived in the middle belt of Ghana as well as the northern territories by the 1940s. The Basel missionaries left the Gold Coast during the First World War in 1917. The work of the Presbyterian church was continued by missionaries from the Church of Scotland, the mother church of the worldwide orthodox or mainstream Presbyterian denomination. The official newspaper of the church is the Christian Messenger, established by the Basel Mission in 1883. The denomination's Presbyterian sister church is the Evangelical Presbyterian Church, Ghana.

Church structure 
The church is a founding member of the Christian Council of Ghana. The association is an umbrella group that unites several churches in Ghana and monitors the activities of members to ensure that they are united in their Christian mission. Ordained ministers wear the Geneva gown and a clerical collar. Historically considered a "high church" denomination, the institution’s form of worship is marked by formality – liturgical readings, traditional hymn singing, church announcements and periodic administering of the Holy Communion. Yearly religious observances, such as Advent and Lent are noted in the church’s almanac. In contemporary times, however, a 'praise and worship' segment, more commonly associated with evangelicalism, Pentecostalism and the charismatic movement, is sometimes incorporated into church services to meet the preferences of younger congregants. The Presbyterian Hymn Book is used during services and is available in primarily English, Ga, Twi, Ewe and other Ghanaian languages and dialects.

The Presbyterian Church of Ghana has seven church departments that have specific tasks of building up the church in their respective activities. These are:
Department of Administration & Human Resource
Department of Church Life & Nurture
Department of Mission & Evangelism
Department of Ecumenical & Social Relations
Department of Development & Social Services
Department of Education
Department of Finance

Membership 
By the 2015, the church had 876,257 members and 2573 congregations. By the end of 2019, the PCG had about a total membership of 1,015,174. According to the 2019 report of the Committee on Information Management, Statistics & Planning (IMSP) of the Department of Administration & Human Resource Management (AHRM) of the church, it had 4889 congregations. As of 2021, there were more than 1.7 million Presbyterians in Ghana, representing approximately 8% of Ghanaian Christians and comprising members of the Presbyterian Church of Ghana, Evangelical Presbyterian Church, Ghana, Global Evangelical Church and other smaller Reformed denominations in the Presbyterian tradition.

PCG Statistics – 2001 to 2013

The Church and education 
Education is an integral part of the church's responsibility to the communities it operates in. In general, Ghanaian Presbyterians have a high educational attainment. Together with Ghanaian Anglicans, Methodists and Roman Catholics - Christian denominations that also prioritize higher education, Presbyterians in Ghana were historically disproportionately represented in the upper ranks of government, industry, academia and the professional occupations. The church is the proprietor of more than 2400 basic schools including 487 kindergarten and nursery schools, 984 primary schools and 399 junior high schools. The church has 30 senior high schools, 40 private schools, 6 vocational institutions, 5 teacher training colleges, 2 research centres, 4 nursing training colleges and 5 training centres for pastors and laity.  In 2003, the church started a university known as the Presbyterian University College. It is located at Abetifi-Kwahu in the Eastern region of Ghana.

The Church and health 
The church is a member of the Christian Health Association of Ghana (CHAG).  CHAG is an umbrella group that unites all the health facilities in Ghana that are owned and run by Christian churches in Ghana. The church is the third largest provider of healthcare in Ghana, in terms of number of health facilities across the country in cities and towns such as Agogo, Bawku, Dormaa-Ahenkro, Donkorkrom, Bolgatanga, Salaga, Tease, Konongo, Duayaw-Nkwanta, Garu, Sandema, etc. Among its 55 health institutions, the church operates four major hospitals, 11 primary health care programmes, eight health centres, 13 clinics, 4 nurses' training colleges and a technical unit. These institutions provide a substantial portion of health services in the rural areas with a workforce of 1,977 and total hospital beds of 745. Curative, preventive and promotive services are provided to clients by the facilities in their respective catchment areas. The PHC interventions cover areas such as antenatal care, postnatal care, family planning, nutrition, growth monitoring of children between 0 – 5 years, immunization, health education, environmental sanitation, HIV&AIDS control, prevention, home-based care and counselling and clinical care at the health centres. The Church is currently the third largest single provider of health
services in the country. The hospitals provide medical specialist services with resident specialists as follows:
Agogo Hospital – Ophthalmology, internal medicine, general surgery, obstetrics / gynaecology and paediatrics
Bawku Hospital – Ophthalmology, general surgery, orthopaedic surgery and obstetrics / gynaecology
Dormaa Hospital – Paediatrics.

The Church and agriculture 
The Presbyterian Church of Ghana was established in 1828 and formalised partnership (Reg No. ACB 146/88) with the then government of Gold Coast now the Republic of Ghana in 1932 to contribute to the Spiritual and socio-economic development of the citizenry of Ghana. To this end, the Church established six (6) Agricultural Service stations in the late sixties in the Northern, Upper East, Eastern and Greater Accra regions of Ghana to complement the efforts of Government at poverty eradication in rural communities of the country.

Assets 
The church owns two printing and publishing houses including Waterville Publishing House, three newspapers, including Christian Messenger and eight bookshops. It has three retreat centres and operates four guest houses and three conference halls.

Church leadership

Moderator of the General Assembly 
The Moderator of the General Assembly position is the chairperson of the general assembly (previously synod), equivalent to the chief executive officer or managing director or president of the governing body of the national church organisation. Serving moderators use the honorific style, The Right Reverend. Retired moderators use the style, The Very Reverend after leaving office.

Synod Clerk / Clerk of the General Assembly 
The Clerk of the General Assembly position (previously Synod Clerk) is the chief ecclesial (ecclesiastical) officer of the general assembly, equivalent to as the chief administrative officer or secretary-general or executive secretary of the national church organisation, responsible for daily operations or performance. The Clerk uses the title style The Reverend. The following ministers were elected and served as the Synod Clerk or Clerk of the General Assembly of the Presbyterian Church of Ghana:

Notable people

Gallery

See also 

Basel Mission
Christianity in Ghana
Christian Messenger
Christ Presbyterian Church, Akropong
Ebenezer Presbyterian Church, Osu
Ramseyer Memorial Presbyterian Church
Evangelical Presbyterian Church, Ghana
Methodist Church Ghana

References 

Protestantism in Ghana
Members of the World Council of Churches
Members of the World Communion of Reformed Churches
1828 establishments in the British Empire
Presbyterian denominations in Africa
Presbyterianism in Ghana